Torà is a town and municipality in the North East of the  comarca (county) of Segarra, in the province of Lleida, Catalonia, Spain. The urban structure of the center has retained most of its original design, with narrow, twisting streets and blocks formed by rows of attached buildings. The Medieval town grew around a castle or fortified place (Thoranum castrum). A particular trait of the fortified origin of the town is the presence of a number of portals to allow several streets their pass through defensive barriers formed by the rows of buildings of the town and its walls. Torà is some 10 kilometers northeast from the more populated Guissona (6,145 inhabitants in 2010), a neighbor town that has experienced an important economic development in the last half century (mainly due to meat production and generation of a meat packing industry) parallel to an unprecedented demographic growth sped up in the recent years (from 3,060 inhabitants in 1998 to 6,145 in 2010).

The municipality stretches along la Vall (valley) de la Riera (creek or brook) de Llanera (the Valley of Llanera's Creek) up to the confluence with the Llobregós River. Its orography is rather uneven with the lowest point at 430m and peaks rising up to 850m above sea level. The North sector features el Tossal (a kind of hill) de l'Aguda (L'Aguda's Hill), el Tossal de Sant Donat (Snat Donat's Hill), and the creek named la Riera de Llanera flowing across. On the other hand, the South sector features the hills el Tossal de Sant Pere and el Tossal de la Pineda, crossed by la Riera de Cellers, one of the Riera de Llaneras tributary brooks merging on its left. The town is settled by the left bank of  the creek la Riera de Llanera, near the confluence with the Llobregós River, at the bottom of the mountain range la Serra de l'Aguda.
In 1968, the former municipality of Llanera was integrated to Torà.

Districts and neighbourhoods
These are the populated places present in the municipality of Torà:
 Cellers (South East)
 Claret (South East)
 Fontanet (Center)
 Llanera (North East)
 Sant Serni de Llanera (East)
 Torà nuclear town (South West)
 Vallferosa (North)

History

Battle of Torà

There was a battle of the Reconquista fought between an alliance of Catalan counts and an army of the Caliphate of Córdoba in 1003 AD at Torà.

Culture

Festivals
 La festa major (the main festival of the town) on 1 September, the feast day of Sant Gil (Saint Giles, the patron saint of Torà, extended to the first weekend of that month.
 La Festa del Brut i la Bruta (the street party of He-brute and She-brute), in the weekend previous to the annual Carnestoltes (carnival).
 La festa del Roser (Rosebush Festival), in May.
 Revetlles populars de barri''' (neighborhood street verbenas, country fairs) in the beginning of the summer, after la Revetlla de Sant Joan (St. John's Eve on midsummer).

Main sights
Municipal constructions
 Plaça del Vall (Moat's Square), the Main Square
 Plaça de la Font (Fountain's Square), in the nucleus
 Font dels Dolors (a public fountain), 200m from the nucleus
 Casa de la Vila (the City Hall), a previous hospital located in Plaça del Vall
 Museu del Pa (local Bread Museum)
 Cementiri (the town's cemetery)
 Aqüeducte dels Frares (aqueduct of the frays) behind Casa Farguell in the place known as Camí dels Tísics. Built with blind round arches, 120m remaining
 Pont de les Merites de Torà (ancient stone bridge) nearby the cemetery, with a round arch
 Pontet del Diable also called Pontet de la Sentiu, the remains of an aqueduct part of Rec del Moriquers also called Rec d'Ivorra, an acequia (a community-operated waterway) started in 1366, in use until 1920. Outside the town toward the South
 Pou del Gel (an ancient ice well)

Military constructions and buildings
 Castell de l'Aguda (castle): in l'Aguda de Torà (ruins, expoliated)
 Torre de Vallferosa (fortified watchtower): in Vallferosa (highly restored)
 Casa Castell de Llanera (castle-house): in Llanera (fortified manor house, very damaged, expoliated)

Romanesque architecture
 Monestir de Sant Celdoni i Sant Ermenter de Cellers (monastery): with three crossing apses and a crypt, in Cellers
 Església de Claret (church), 12th century (highly reformed)
 Església de Sant Miquel (church): in Fontanet
 Església de Santa Maria de Llanera (church): in Llanera (expoliated)
 Església de Sant Salvador (church): in l'Aguda de Torà

Jewish legacy
 Antic call jueu de Torà (the former Jewish quarter): in Torà's central nucleus
Location: Carrer Nou, with access through two portals: Portal Nou at Plaça del Pati (Courtyard's Square), and a portal at Plaça de l'Església (Church's Square)

Other monumental buildings
 Convent de Sant Anatoni de Pàdua'' (a convent devoted to Saint Anthony of Padua), built between 1697 and 1747
 L'Hostal (hostal), still in use
 Església de Santa Maria (church): in Vallferosa (expoliated)

Gallery

Communications

Torà is along the county road C-1412. Coming from Balaguer,  C-1313 towards La Seu d'Urgell until Ponts and then, the road C-1412 towards Calaf.
Coming from Cervera, the national road N-141, then the local road LV-3003.

Demographics

See also
 Battle of Torà
 Battle of Albesa
 Guissona (closest town to Torà, some 10 km away Southwest.)

References

External links

   Town Council's website
 Turisme Segarra .com /pobles /Torà (portal de la Segarra a Internet), article with some detailed information about Torà published in the County's Tourism Website.
 Lleida .com /municipis, a borough's database.
 Government data pages 

Municipalities in Segarra
Populated places in Segarra